Niambia is a genus of woodlice in the family Platyarthridae. There are at least 20 described species in Niambia.

Species
These 23 species belong to the genus Niambia:

 Niambia angusta Budde-Lund, 1909 i c g
 Niambia brevicauda Schmalfuss & Ferrara, 1978 i c g
 Niambia buddelundi Barnard, 1949 i c g
 Niambia capensis (Dollfus, 1895) i c g b
 Niambia damarensis (Panning, 1924) i c g
 Niambia duffeyi Ferrara & Taiti, 1981 i c g
 Niambia eburnea (Vandel, 1953) i c g
 Niambia flavescens Barnard, 1924 i c g
 Niambia formicarum Barnard, 1932 i c g
 Niambia griseoflava Barnard, 1924 i c g
 Niambia lata Barnard, 1932 c g
 Niambia longiantennata Taiti & Ferrara, 1991 i c g
 Niambia longicauda Barnard, 1924 i c g
 Niambia microps Barnard, 1932 c g
 Niambia modesta Budde-Lund, 1909 i c g
 Niambia pallida Budde-Lund, 1909 i c g
 Niambia palmetensis Vandel, 1959 i c g
 Niambia politus Omer-Cooper, 1924 i g
 Niambia senegalensis Schmalfuss & Ferrara, 1978 i c g
 Niambia septentrionalis Taiti & Ferrara, 2004 c g
 Niambia squamata (Budde-Lund, 1885) i c g
 Niambia termitophila Kensley, 1971 i c g
 Niambia truncata (Brandt, 1833) i c g

Data sources: i = ITIS, c = Catalogue of Life, g = GBIF, b = Bugguide.net

References

Further reading

 
 
 

Woodlice
Isopod genera